Richview Collegiate Institute (Richview CI, RCI or Richview) is a secondary school in Etobicoke, in the west end of Toronto, Ontario. It is in the Etobicoke Board of Education which in turn became the part of the Toronto District School Board in 1998. The motto is Monumentum Aere Perennius ("A monument more lasting than bronze").

History
The school was constructed in 1957 and opened in September 1958. It is an English and French Immersion Secondary School.  As of 2014–2015, enrolment at the school was 999.

Overview

Extracurricular activities
Richview's sports teams are known as the Saints and the school colours are Scarlet and Gold. School teams compete in archery, badminton, baseball, basketball, cheerleading, cross country, rugby, curling, golf, football, ice hockey, curling, skiing, soccer, swimming, tennis, track & field, archery and volleyball.

Students may also participate in: Intermediate, or Senior Band, Stage Band, Junior Orchestra/Symphony, Senior Strings, Choir, Charity Week Activities, Fashion Show, Volleyball, Tennis, Swimming, Soccer, Cross Country, Track & Field, Athletic Council, Parent Council as well as various activities in the dramatic arts such as short plays, the SEARS Drama Festival Production and the Improv Team.

Student Newspaper
The Richview Voice was launched as an online newspaper in 2016. Former newspapers have been the Richview Herald launched in 2011, the Richview Epiphany launched in the 2008–2009 school year, and the R C Eye (a play on the school's initials, RCI), from the late 1960s.

Notable alumni
Stephen Harper, 22nd Prime Minister of Canada. Attended Richview from 1973 to 1978
Nicole Stamp, host of TV's Reach For The Top
Margo Timmins, lead singer of 1980s Canadian band Cowboy Junkies
Joey Votto, MLB first baseman for the Cincinnati Reds, 2010 NL MVP. Attended Richview from 1997 to 2002
Paul Watson, 1994 Pulitzer Prize-winning journalist
Bob Weeks, TSN golf analyst, author and editor.
Scott Mellanby, retired NHL forward
Elliott Richardson, former defensive back in the CFL
Lisa Ray, model and Bollywood actress
Gurdeep Ahluwalia, television broadcaster for CP24 and TSN SportsCentre
Greg Hogeboom, Pro hockey player (Europe), drafted to LA Kings
Gordon Giffin, thirty-fourth Ambassador of the United States to Canada.
Roland McKeown, NHL prospect (Carolina Hurricanes). Attended Richview from 2010 to 2012
Sam Bennett, NHL player for the Florida Panthers. Attended Richview from 2010 to 2012
Katheryn Winnick, Actress
Brooke D'Orsay, Actress

See also
List of high schools in Ontario

Notes

References
Richview Collegiate Institute. (2004) Current School Profile with EQAO Assessment Results. Retrieved July 11, 2005.
Richview Collegiate Institute Student Alumni: 1970s. Retrieved July 11, 2005.
Fraser Institute Report. Fraser Institute Report. Retrieved November 9, 2009

External links

Richview Collegiate Institute.
TDSB Profile
Richview Herald

Educational institutions established in 1958
Education in Etobicoke
High schools in Toronto
Schools in the TDSB
1958 establishments in Ontario